Ugly Miss Young-ae is a long-running South Korean television series starring Kim Hyun-sook. The series premiered on tvN in South Korea on April 20, 2007.

It is now on its 17th season, starting February 8, 2019.

Synopsis
A realistic drama about the thrills and sadness of working women in their 30s, centered around a single woman named Lee Young-ae (Kim Hyun-sook).

Broadcast schedule

Cast

Main

Lee Young-ae's Design
 Kim Hyun-sook as Lee Young-ae - President (season 1-17)
 Go Se-won as Kim Hyuk-kyoo - Employee, Lee Young-chae's husband (season 1 - 9, 11, 14 - 17: main; season 10, 12, 13: guest)
 Han Ki-woong as Han Ki-woong (season 12-16)

Support

Paradise General Printing Company
 Jo Duk-jae
 Lee Seung-joon as Lee Seung-joon, Young-ae husband (season 12-17)
 Choi Hyo-eun as Go-young
 Ra Mi-ran
 Yoon Seo-hyun
 Jung Ji-soon
 Lee Soo-min
 Sazal Kim

Whale Seafood
 Jo Dong-hyuk
 Jung Soo-hwan

Young-ae's family
 Song Min-hyung as Lee Gwi-hyun, Young-ae, Young-min & Young-chae's father (season 1-17)
 Kim Jung-ha as Kim Jung-ha, Young-ae, Young-min & Young-chae's mother (season 1-17)
 Jung Da-hye as Lee Young-chae, Young-ae's younger sister (season 1-5, 9-17: regular, season 8: guest)
 Park Shin-woo (season 1)
 Hyun Jung (season 5-8)
 Oh Seung-yoon as Lee Young-min, Young-ae's younger brother (season 13: regular; season 16: guest)

Others
 Jun Sung-ae as Jun Sung-ae
 Lee Woo-joo as Hyun Woo
 Jung Yoon-gun as Hae Mil
 Lee Ki-chang

Special appearances
 Seo Gap-sook
 Jang Hyuk-jin
 Tak Jae-hoon
 Lee Yong-joo
 Kwon Hyuk-soo
 Yoo In-na
 Kim Jun-hyun as Martial arts dojo director (episode 12)
 Kim Ga-yeon
 Jang Do-yeon as Miran Red Shoes sales man (episode 14)
 Kim Hyung-il

Crew

Awards

Ratings
For season 15, the average audience share was 2.6% (AGB Nielsen Ratings) or 3.2% (TNmS Ratings).

References

External links
 
 

TVN (South Korean TV channel) television dramas
Korean-language television shows
2007 South Korean television series debuts
Television series by CJ E&M